The tenth season of NYPD Blue premiered on ABC on September 24, 2002, and concluded on May 20, 2003.

Episodes

Notes

References

NYPD Blue seasons
2002 American television seasons
2003 American television seasons